The 2015–16 Arizona Wildcats men's basketball team represented the University of Arizona during the 2015–16 NCAA Division I men's basketball season. The team was led by seventh-year head coach Sean Miller, and played their home games at McKale Center in Tucson, Arizona as a member of the Pac-12 Conference. They finished the season 25–9, 12–6 in Pac-12 play to tie with California for third place. They defeated Colorado in the quarterfinals of the Pac-12 tournament to advance to the semifinals where they lost to Oregon. Arizona received an at-large bid to the fourth-straight NCAA tournament, the program's 31st appearance, as a 6-seed in the South Region. They lost in the first round to Wichita State.

Previous season

The 2014–15 Arizona Wildcats finished the season with an overall record of 34–4 and a 16–2 conference record to win their second straight Pac-12 regular season championship (14th overall). Arizona claimed the longest active home winning streak in D-I men's college basketball (38th home win at 2nd all-time, 82nd home win at 5th all-time) after BYU defeated Gonzaga in the regular season finale, snapping the nation's longest active home winning streak of 41 games, as well as Gonzaga's school record 22-game winning streak. In the Pac-12 Tournament as a #1 seed, Arizona defeated #8 seed California Golden Bears; 73–51, and #4 seed UCLA Bruins; 70–64. The Wildcats then went on to beat Oregon Ducks; 80–52 in the Pac-12 Tournament championship game, and claimed their 5th Pac-12 tournament title for the first time since 2002, along with punching their 32nd ticket to the NCAA Tournament. Arizona entered the NCAA tournament  as a #2 seed in the West region, and defeated #15 seed Texas Southern Tigers 93–72, then #10 seed Ohio State Buckeyes; 73–58, and #6 seed Xavier Musketeers, to gain its third trip (2nd straight) to the Elite Eight, as well as Sean Miller's first as head coach. The Wildcats then fell to #1 seed Wisconsin Badgers; 85–78 for the second time (from the Elite Eight's by 1 point overtime loss in last year).

Off-season

Departures

Incoming transfers

2015 recruiting class

Personnel
On April 13, assistant coach Damon Stoudamire left the team to rejoin the Memphis staff under head coach and former UA player Josh Pastner. On May 22 Mark Phelps, joined the Arizona staff.

Roster

Oct 24, 2015 – Freshman Ray Smith to miss entire 2015–16 season due to a torn ACL in his right knee.
Dec 1, 2015 – Senior Kaleb Tarczewski missed 8 games due to left foot injury. Returned for Pac-12 season play against Arizona State.
Jan 10, 2015 – Freshman Allonzo Trier missed 7 games due to a right hand injury. Returned Feb. 6 game at Washington.
Junior Elliott Pitts out since Dec. 9 game against Fresno State, due to an undisclosed personal issue. After the Feb. 17 game against Arizona State, Sean Miller announced Pitts would not return for the remainder of the season.

Depth chart

Coaching staff

Schedule

|-
!colspan=12 style=| Exhibition

|-
!colspan=12 style=| Non-conference regular season

|-
!colspan=12 style=";"| 

|-
!colspan=12 style=";"| 

|-
!colspan=12 style=";"| NCAA tournament

Ranking movement

*AP does not release post-NCAA tournament rankings

Player statistics
As of Mar. 21, 2016

Honors

Award Watchlists
 Kareem Abdul-Jabbar Award – Kaleb Tarczewski
 Wooden Award Preseason Top 50 – Kaleb Tarczewski
 Jerry West Award – Allonzo Trier 
 Wooden Award Midseason Top 25 – Ryan Anderson
 Naismith Memorial Basketball Hall of Fame - 2016 Karl Malone Power Forward of the Year Finalist – Ryan Anderson
 Lute Olson National Player of the Year Award Finalist – Ryan Anderson

Weekly Awards

Season Awards

See also
2015–16 Arizona Wildcats women's basketball team

References

Arizona Wildcats men's basketball seasons
Arizona
Arizona Wildcats men's basketball
Arizona Wildcats men's basketball
Arizona